Leiden University (abbreviated as LEI) is a public research university in Leiden, Netherlands. It was founded as a Protestant university in 1575 by William, Prince of Orange, as a reward to the city of Leiden for its defence against Spanish attacks during the Eighty Years' War. As the oldest institution of higher education in the Netherlands, it enjoys a solid reputation across Europe and the world.

Known for its historic foundations and emphasis on the social sciences, the university came into particular prominence during the Dutch Golden Age, when scholars from around Europe were attracted to the Dutch Republic due to its climate of intellectual tolerance and Leiden's international reputation. During this time, Leiden became the home to individuals such as René Descartes, Rembrandt, Christiaan Huygens, Hugo Grotius, Baruch Spinoza and Baron d'Holbach.

The university has seven academic faculties and over fifty subject departments while housing more than 40 national and international research institutes. Its historical primary campus consists of buildings scattered across the college town of Leiden, while a second campus located in The Hague houses a liberal arts college (Leiden University College The Hague) and several of its faculties. It is a member of the Coimbra Group, the Europaeum and a founding member of the League of European Research Universities.

Leiden University consistently ranks among the best universities in the world by prominent international ranking tables, being placed in the top 50 worldwide in thirteen fields of study in the 2020 QS World University Rankings: classics & ancient history, politics, archaeology, anthropology, history, pharmacology, law, public policy, public administration, religious studies, arts & humanities, linguistics, modern languages and sociology. In the 2022 ShanghaiRanking Global Ranking of Academic Subjects it is ranked 3rd in the world in Public Administration, 12th in Medical Technology, 22nd in Pharmacy & Pharmaceutical Sciences, 40th in Political Sciences and 49th in Library & Information Science.

The university has produced twenty-six Spinoza Prize Laureates and sixteen Nobel Laureates, including Enrico Fermi and Albert Einstein. It is closely associated with the Dutch royal family, with Queen Juliana, Queen Beatrix and King Willem-Alexander being alumni. Ten Prime Ministers of the Netherlands are also alumni, including incumbent Prime Minister Mark Rutte. Internationally, Leiden University is associated with several leaders, including a President of the United States, two NATO Secretaries-General, a President of the International Court of Justice and a Prime Minister of the United Kingdom.

History

Foundation and early history

In 1575, the emerging Dutch Republic did not have any universities in its northern heartland. The only other university in the Habsburg Netherlands was the University of Leuven in southern Leuven, firmly under Spanish control. The scientific renaissance had begun to highlight the importance of academic study, so Prince William founded the first Dutch university in Leiden, to give the Northern Netherlands an institution that could educate its citizens for religious purposes, but also to give the country and its government educated men in other fields. It is said the choice fell on Leiden as a reward for the heroic defence of Leiden against Spanish attacks in the previous year (see pages Siege of Leiden and Leidens Ontzet). Ironically, the name of Philip II of Spain, William's adversary, appears on the official foundation certificate, as he was still the de jure count of Holland. Philip II replied by forbidding any subject to study in Leiden. Originally located in the convent of St Barbara, the university moved to the Faliede Bagijn Church in 1577 (now the location of the university museum) and in 1581 to the convent of the White Nuns, a site which it still occupies, though the original building was destroyed by fire in 1616.

The presence within half a century of the date of its foundation of such scholars as Justus Lipsius, Joseph Scaliger, Franciscus Gomarus, Hugo Grotius, Jacobus Arminius, Daniel Heinsius and Gerhard Johann Vossius, rapidly made Leiden university into a highly regarded institution that attracted students from across Europe in the 17th century, with more than 500 students enrolled in the 1640s making it the largest university in the Protestant world. Renowned philosopher Baruch Spinoza was based close to Leiden during this period and interacted with numerous scholars at the university. The learning and reputation of Jacobus Gronovius, Herman Boerhaave, Tiberius Hemsterhuis and David Ruhnken, among others, enabled Leiden to maintain its reputation for excellence down to the end of the 18th century.

At the end of the nineteenth century, Leiden University again became one of Europe's leading universities. In 1896 the Zeeman effect was discovered there by Pieter Zeeman and shortly afterwards given a classical explanation by Hendrik Antoon Lorentz. At the world's first university low-temperature laboratory, professor Heike Kamerlingh Onnes achieved temperatures of only one degree above absolute zero of −273 degrees Celsius. In 1908 he was also the first to succeed in liquifying helium and can be credited with the discovery of the superconductivity in metals.

Modern day

The University Library, which has more than 5.2 million books and fifty thousand journals, also has a number of internationally renowned special collections of western and oriental manuscripts, printed books, archives, prints, drawings, photographs, maps, and atlases. It houses the largest collections worldwide on Indonesia and the Caribbean. The research activities of the Scaliger Institute focus on these special collections and concentrate particularly on the various aspects of the transmission of knowledge and ideas through texts and images from antiquity to the present day.

In 2005 the manuscript of Einstein on the quantum theory of the monatomic ideal gas (the Einstein-Bose condensation) (condensate) was discovered in one of Leiden's libraries.

The portraits of many famous professors since the earliest days hang in the university aula, one of the most memorable places, as Niebuhr called it, in the history of science.

In 2012 Leiden entered into a strategic alliance with Delft University of Technology and Erasmus University Rotterdam in order for the universities to increase the quality of their research and teaching. The university is also the unofficial home of the Bilderberg Group, a meeting of high-level political and economic figures from North America and Europe.

Leiden University partnered with Duke University School of Law starting in 2017 to run a joint summer program on global and transnational law from the Hague campus.

Location and buildings

The university has no central campus; its buildings are spread over the city. Some buildings, like the Gravensteen, are very old, while buildings like Lipsius and Gorlaeus are much more modern.

Among the institutions affiliated with the university are The KITLV or Royal Netherlands Institute of Southeast Asian and Caribbean Studies (founded in 1851), the Leiden Observatory 1633; the Natural History Museum, with a very complete anatomical cabinet; the Rijksmuseum van Oudheden (National Museum of Antiquities), with specially valuable Egyptian and Indian departments; a museum of Dutch antiquities from the earliest times; and three ethnographical museums, of which the nucleus was Philipp Franz von Siebold's Japanese collections. The anatomical and pathological laboratories of the university are modern, and the museums of geology and mineralogy have been restored.

The Hortus Botanicus (botanical garden) is the oldest botanical garden in the Netherlands, and one of the oldest in the world. Plants from all over the world have been carefully cultivated here by experts for more than four centuries. The Clusius garden (a reconstruction), the 18th century Orangery with its monumental tub plants, the rare collection of historical trees hundreds of years old, the Japanese Siebold Memorial Museum symbolising the historical link between East and West, the tropical greenhouses with their world class plant collections, and the central square and Conservatory exhibiting exotic plants from South Africa and southern Europe.

Campus The Hague

In 1998, the university has also expanded to The Hague which has become home to Campus The Hague, with six of the seven faculties represented and exclusive home to the Faculty of Governance and Global Affairs, International Studies and Leiden University College The Hague, a liberal arts and sciences college. Here, the university offers academic courses in the fields of law, political science, public administration and medicine. It occupied a number of buildings in the centre of the city, including a college building at Lange Voorhout, before moving into the new 'Wijnhaven' building on Turfmarkt in 2016.

The Faculty of Governance and Global Affairs was established in 2011, together with the University College, and one of the largest programmes of the Faculty of Humanities, International Studies.

Since 2017 Leiden University Medical Center also has a branch at Campus The Hague.

Organisation

The university is divided into seven major faculties which offer approximately 50 undergraduate degree programmes and over 100 graduate programmes.

 Archaeology
 Governance and Global Affairs
 Humanities
 Law
 Medicine / LUMC
 Science
 Social and Behavioural sciences

Academic profile

Undergraduate studies
Most of the university's departments offer their own degree programme(s). Undergraduate programmes lead to either a B.A., B.Sc. or LL.B. degree. Other degrees, such as the B.Eng. or B.F.A., are not awarded at Leiden University.

Graduate studies
Students can choose from a range of graduate programmes. Most of the above-mentioned undergraduate programmes can be continued with either a general or a specialised graduate program. Leiden University offers more than 100 graduate programs leading to either MA, MSc, MPhil, or LLM degrees. The MPhil is the most advanced graduate degree and is awarded by select departments of the university (mostly in the fields of Arts, Social Sciences, Archeology, Philosophy, and Theology). Admission to these programmes is highly selective and primarily aimed at those students opting for an academic career or before going into law or medicine. Traditionally, the MPhil degree enabled its holder to teach at the university levels as an associate professor. The MPhil degree is also common in elite universities in the UK (Oxford and Cambridge), and the Ivy League in the United States.

Doctorate programmes

In addition, most departments, affiliated (research) institutes or faculties offer doctorate programmes or positions, leading to the PhD degree. Most of the PhD programmes offered by the university are concentrated in several research schools or institutes.

Research schools and affiliated institutes

Leiden University has more than 50 research and graduate schools and institutes. Some of them are fully affiliated with one faculty of the university, while others are interfaculty institutes or even interuniversity institutes.

Rankings and reputation

Notable alumni and professors

Of the 105 Spinoza Prize laureates (the highest scientific award of The Netherlands), twenty-six were granted to professors of Leiden University. Literary historian Frits van Oostrom was the first professor of Leiden to be granted the Spinoza award for his work on developing the NLCM centre (Dutch literature and culture in the Middle Ages) into a top research centre. Other Spinoza Prize winners are linguists Frederik Kortlandt and Pieter Muysken, mathematician Hendrik Lenstra, physicists Carlo Beenakker, Jan Zaanen, Dirk Bouwmeester and Michel Orrit, astronomers Ewine van Dishoeck, Marijn Franx and Alexander Tielens, transplantation biologist Els Goulmy, clinical epidemiologist Frits Rosendaal, pedagogue Marinus van IJzendoorn, archeologists Wil Roebroeks and Corinne Hofman, neurologist Michel Ferrari, classicist Ineke Sluiter, social psychologist Naomi Ellemers, statistician Aad van der Vaart, cognitive psychologist Eveline Crone, organisation psychologist Carsten de Dreu, chemical immunologist Sjaak Neefjes, parasitologist Maria Yazdanbakhsh, electrochemist Mark Koper and astrophysicist Ignas Snellen.

The Stevin Prize laureates who have achieved exceptional success in the area of knowledge exchange and impact for society include the following Leiden professors: health psychologist Andrea Evers, immunology technologist Ton Schumacher and psychologist Judi Mesman. Among other leading professors are Wim Blockmans, professor of Medieval History, and Willem Adelaar, professor of Amerindian Languages.

Nobel laureates
Kamerlingh Onnes was awarded the Nobel Prize for Physics in 1913. Three other professors received the Nobel Prize for their research performed at Universiteit Leiden: Hendrik Antoon Lorentz and Pieter Zeeman received the Nobel Prize for their pioneering work in the field of optical and electronic phenomena, and the physiologist Willem Einthoven for his invention of the string galvanometer, which among other things, enabled the development of electrocardiography.

Nobel laureates associated with Leiden include: the physicists Albert Einstein, Enrico Fermi and Paul Ehrenfest. Also: Jacobus Henricus van 't Hoff, Johannes Diderik van der Waals, Tobias Asser, Albert Szent-Györgyi, Igor Tamm, Jan Tinbergen, Nikolaas Tinbergen, Tjalling Koopmans, Nicolaas Bloembergen and Niels Jerne.

Other notable Leiden researchers were the Arabist and Islam expert Christiaan Snouck Hurgronje, the law expert Cornelis van Vollenhoven and historian Johan Huizinga, all during the 1920s and 1930s. Martinus Beijerinck, one of the founders of virology, finished his PhD at Leiden in 1877.

See also
 Leiden school
 Leiden University College The Hague
 List of early modern universities in Europe
 List of rectores magnifici of Leiden University

References

Further reading
  Online version: The Bastion of Liberty - (Open Access)
 Willem Otterspeer: Good, gratifying and renowned. A concise history of Leiden University. Transl. by John R.J. Eyck. Leiden, 2015. 
 
 Heinz Schneppen: Niederländische Universitäten und deutsches Geistesleben. Von der Gründung der Universität Leiden bis ins späte 18. Jahrhundert, Münster 1960. Neue Münstersche Beiträge zur Geschichtsforschung Bd. 6

External links

  
  

 
Buildings and structures in Leiden
Educational institutions established in the 1570s
1575 establishments in the Netherlands
Education in South Holland
Education in the Dutch Republic
Science and technology in the Dutch Republic
William the Silent